This was the first edition of the tournament.

Ruan Roelofse and Christopher Rungkat won the title after defeating Fred Gil and Gonçalo Oliveira 7–6(9–7), 6–1 in the final.

Seeds

Draw

References
 Main Draw

Lisboa Belém Open - Doubles
2017 Doubles
2017 Lisboa Belém Open